The 1973 Masters Tournament was the 37th Masters Tournament, held April 5–9 at the Augusta National Golf Club. Due to weather delays, the final round was played on Monday for the first time since 1961. 

Tommy Aaron, age 36, won his only major title, one stroke ahead of runner-up J. C. Snead. Before this win at Augusta, Aaron was best known as the player who kept Roberto De Vicenzo's incorrect scorecard at the Masters five years earlier in 1968. Ironically, Aaron's final round playing partner in 1973, Johnny Miller, recorded a higher score when keeping Aaron's card, and Aaron caught the mistake. This was his third and last victory on the PGA Tour, and after this win, Aaron's best result in a major was a tie for 28th at the Masters in 1979.

Gary Player played in 52 Masters from 1957 through 2009; and missed only this one, to recover from leg and abdominal surgery. He returned in 1974 to win the second of his three green jackets.

Gay Brewer won the fourteenth Par 3 contest on Wednesday with a seven-under 20.  At the previous Masters, the 1967 champion was hospitalized in Augusta for ulcers on Wednesday night and missed the tournament.

This Masters was the last as competitors for two former champions: Gene Sarazen (1935) and Ralph Guldahl (1939).

Field
1. Masters champions
George Archer (8), Gay Brewer (10,11), Billy Casper (8,9,10,12), Charles Coody (8,12), Doug Ford, Bob Goalby (8), Ralph Guldahl, Jack Nicklaus (2,3,4,8,9,11,12), Arnold Palmer (9,11,12), Gene Sarazen, Sam Snead (10), Art Wall Jr.
Jack Burke Jr., Jimmy Demaret, Claude Harmon, Ben Hogan, Herman Keiser, Cary Middlecoff, Byron Nelson, Henry Picard, and Gary Player (3,4,8,9,10) did not play. Player missed his only Masters in 53 years to recover from surgery.

The following categories only apply to Americans

2. U.S. Open champions (last five years)
Orville Moody (9), Lee Trevino (3,9,11,12)

3. The Open champions (last five years)

4. PGA champions (last five years)
Julius Boros, Raymond Floyd (10), Dave Stockton (12)

5. The first eight finishers in the 1972 U.S. Amateur
Doug Ballenger (a), Ben Crenshaw (7,8,a), Vinny Giles (6,7,a), Charles Harrison (a), Mike Killian (a), Marty West (7,a)

Mark Hayes (7,a) forfeited his exemption by turning professional. Bruce Robertson forfeited his exemption by losing his amateur status.

6. Previous two U.S. Amateur and Amateur champions

Steve Melnyk forfeited his exemption by turning professional.

7. Members of the 1972 U.S. Eisenhower Trophy team

8. Top 24 players and ties from the 1972 Masters Tournament
Homero Blancas (9), Gardner Dickinson (12), Al Geiberger, Hubert Green, Paul Harney, Jerry Heard (10,11), Jim Jamieson (10,11), Jerry McGee, Steve Melnyk, Bobby Mitchell (11), Lanny Wadkins (11), Tom Weiskopf (9), Bert Yancey (9,11)

9. Top 16 players and ties from the 1972 U.S. Open
Don January, Don Massengale, Johnny Miller (11), Bobby Nichols, Chi-Chi Rodríguez (11), Cesar Sanudo, Jim Simons, Kermit Zarley (11)

10. Top eight players and ties from 1972 PGA Championship
Tommy Aaron, Phil Rodgers, Doug Sanders (11)

11. Winners of PGA Tour events since the previous Masters
Buddy Allin, Deane Beman, Jim Colbert, Bob Dickson, Rod Funseth, Lou Graham, Dave Hill, Mike Hill, Babe Hiskey, Grier Jones, Bob Lunn, John Schlee, J. C. Snead (12), DeWitt Weaver

12. Members of the U.S. 1971 Ryder Cup team
Miller Barber, Frank Beard, Gene Littler, Mason Rudolph

13. Foreign invitations
Brian Barnes, Bob Charles (8), Gary Cowan (6,a), Bruce Crampton (8,9,11), Roberto De Vicenzo (8), Bruce Devlin (8,11), David Graham (11), Han Chang-sang, Trevor Homer (6,a), Guy Hunt, Tony Jacklin (2,3), George Knudson (11), Takaaki Kono (8), Lu Liang-Huan, Peter Oosterhuis, Masashi Ozaki, Bob Shaw (11)

Numbers in brackets indicate categories that the player would have qualified under had they been American.

Round summaries

First round
Thursday, April 5, 1973

Source

Second round
Friday, April 6, 1973

Source

Third round
Sunday, April 8, 1973

Heavy rain on Saturday morning limited play to the first several pairs when the course was deemed unplayable. The third round was restarted in the late morning on Sunday from split tees.

Source

Final round
Monday, April 9, 1973

Final leaderboard

Sources:

Scorecard

Cumulative tournament scores, relative to par

References

External links
Masters.com – past winners and results
Augusta.com – 1973 Masters leaderboard and scorecards

1973
1973 in golf
1973 in American sports
1973 in sports in Georgia (U.S. state)
April 1973 sports events in the United States